Neither Black nor White: Slavery and Race Relations in Brazil and the United States is a 1971 nonfiction book written by American author Carl N. Degler, published by University of Wisconsin Press, which contrasts racial attitudes in the United States and Brazil, arguing that Brazilian culture developed a more fluid idea of race than American culture did, which maintained sharp distinctions between "black" and "white." The book was awarded the 1972 Pulitzer Prize for History.

References 

1971 non-fiction books
American history books
Books about African-American history
20th-century history books
Pulitzer Prize for History-winning works
University of Wisconsin Press books